The Scarsdale station is a commuter rail stop on the Metro-North Railroad's Harlem Line, located in  Scarsdale, New York. Scarsdale is the southernmost station on the two-track section of the Harlem Line; a third track begins to the south.

Scarsdale is the second busiest Metro-North station in Westchester County, after White Plains. It is the southernmost station in the Zone 4 Metro-North fare zone. As of August 2006, weekday commuter ridership was 4,080, and there are 919 parking spots.

History 

The New York and Harlem Railroad laid tracks through Scarsdale during the 1840s, and established a station in Scarsdale as far back as 1846. The existing station house was built by the New York Central and Hudson River Railroad in 1904 (although some evidence dates it back to 1902) in the Tudor Revival style. As with the rest of the Harlem Line, the merger of New York Central with Pennsylvania Railroad in 1968 transformed the station into a Penn Central Railroad station. Penn Central's continuous financial despair throughout the 1970s forced them to turn over their commuter service to the Metropolitan Transportation Authority, and it officially became part of Metro-North in 1983. The station has been on the National Register of Historic Places since the year 2000, and faced a restoration project in 2007.

Station layout
The station has two high-level side platforms, which are 12 cars long.

See also
National Register of Historic Places listings in southern Westchester County, New York

Bibliography

References

External links

Scarsdale Metro-North station; In Color (TheSubwayNut)
Popham Road entrance from Google Maps Street View

Metro-North Railroad stations in New York (state)
Former New York Central Railroad stations
Railway stations in Westchester County, New York
Railway stations on the National Register of Historic Places in New York (state)
National Register of Historic Places in Westchester County, New York
Historic American Buildings Survey in New York (state)
Railway stations in the United States opened in 1844
Scarsdale, New York
1844 establishments in New York (state)
Transportation in Westchester County, New York